Little Heath is a locality in Romford. To the east is Chadwell Heath in the London Borough of Barking and Dagenham, after which it was modelled. The postcode for the area is RM6. Little Heath School is based in the area. East London Transit route EL3 terminates at Little Heath.

Areas of London
Districts of the London Borough of Redbridge
Ilford